Too Pure – The Peel Sessions is a compilation CD and 10" vinyl LP released by Strange Fruit by arrangement with the indie label Too Pure in 1992, and featuring their three most up-and-coming bands at the time. It contains some of the earliest commercially released work by PJ Harvey.

The sessions on the album were recorded for John Peel's BBC Radio 1 show between March and October 1991.

The 10" vinyl was a limited, numbered edition of 3499 copies. A section of the cover was left white; this was then painted over by hand so that each of the LPs featured a different artwork.

Track listing
 Th' Faith Healers recorded 24 March 1991
"Coffee Commercial Couples" (Hopkin)
 "Bobby Kopper" (Cullinan)
 "Jesus Freak" (Cullinan)

 Stereolab recorded 30 July 1991
 "Super-Electric" (Gane/Sadier)
 "Changer" (Gane/Sadier)
 "Doubt" (Gane/Sadier)
 "Difficult Fourth Title" (Gane/Sadier)

 PJ Harvey recorded 29 October 1991
 "Oh My Lover" (Harvey)
 "Victory" (Harvey)
 "Sheela-Na-Gig" (Harvey)
 "Water" (Harvey)

References

Peel Sessions recordings
PJ Harvey albums
1992 live albums
1992 compilation albums
Th' Faith Healers albums
Split albums
Stereolab live albums